Elaeocarpus inopinatus is a species of flowering plant in the Elaeocarpaceae family. It is a tree endemic to Borneo where it is confined to Sabah.

Description
Eleaeocarpus inopinatus is a small tree, growing up to 12 meters tall.

Range and habitat
Elaeocarpus inopinatus is known only from Marai Parai, a plateau on the northwestern side of Mount Kinabalu. It grows in scrubby forest over ultramafic rock between 1,500 and 1,700 meters elevation. The species' estimated area of occupancy (AOO) and extent of occurrence (EOO) are both 4 km2.

The species' habitat is protected within in Kinabalu Park, and its habitat and population are not declining. Its limited range makes the species vulnerable to hazards like fire, drought, and landslide.

References

inopinatus
Endemic flora of Borneo
Trees of Borneo
Flora of Sabah
Flora of the Borneo montane rain forests
Flora of Mount Kinabalu
Vulnerable plants
Taxonomy articles created by Polbot